Rafael Manuel Pascual (born 18 December 1951) is an Argentine politician of the Radical Civic Union. He was a National Deputy elected in Buenos Aires on two occasions, from 1987 to 1989, and later from 1993 to 2001. From 1999 to 2001 he was President of the Chamber of Deputies.

Early life
Pascual was born on 18 December 1951 in the Parque Patricios barrio of Buenos Aires. Before entering politics, he worked as a realtor and administered a gambling agency. He studied law at the University of Buenos Aires. In 1970, as a student, he joined Franja Morada, the Radical Civic Union's student wing. Later, in 1972, he was a delegate to the Argentine University Federation, and in 1975 he became president of the Buenos Aires Juventud Radical.

Political career
Early in his career, as a member of the Juventud Radical, Pascual was a supporter of Ricardo Balbín. Pascual was first elected to the National Chamber of Deputies as part of the Radical Civic Union (UCR) list in Buenos Aires in the 1987 legislative elections. In 1989, he succeeded Fernando de la Rúa as president of the Buenos Aires UCR Committee. He was elected to the Chamber of Deputies a second time in 1993.

He served as Fernando de la Rúa's campaign manager during his successful 1999 presidential run. In that year's legislative election, he ran for re-election in Buenos Aires as the first candidate in the UCR list. Following the election of de la Rúa, Pascual was tapped to be the next president of the Chamber of Deputies, office he took on 10 December 1999. In December 2001, in the aftermath of the political and economic crisis and de la Rúa's resignation, Pascual resigned from his position as president of the Chamber and was succeeded by the peronist Eduardo Camaño.

Personal life
Pascual is married to Graciela Dalma, a judge based in Buenos Aires, and has three children. He is a supporter of Club Atlético Huracán.

References

|-

1951 births
Living people
Politicians from Buenos Aires
Members of the Argentine Chamber of Deputies elected in Buenos Aires
Presidents of the Argentine Chamber of Deputies
Radical Civic Union politicians
University of Buenos Aires alumni
20th-century Argentine politicians
21st-century Argentine politicians